The Smith Family Cemetery, in Nauvoo, Illinois, is the burial place of Joseph Smith, his wife Emma, and brother Hyrum. Joseph Smith's parents Joseph Smith Sr. and Lucy Mack Smith are also buried there, as are Joseph Smith's brothers Samuel and Don Carlos. Others buried there include Robert B. Thompson and Emma Smith's second husband Lewis C. Bidamon.

Overlooking the Mississippi River, the cemetery is located on Water Street, and is open 24 hours a day to visitors. The site is owned and maintained by the Community of Christ.

In 1991, the cemetery was renovated and dedicated by two members of the Smith family: M. Russell Ballard, an apostle of the Church of Jesus Christ of Latter-day Saints, and Wallace B. Smith, prophet-president of the Reorganized Church of Jesus Christ of Latter Day Saints. (Ballard is a descendant of Hyrum Smith and Wallace B. Smith is a descendant of Joseph Smith.)

See also

 Death of Joseph Smith: Interment

References

External links
 
 
 Historicnauvoo.net
 Cofchrist.org

Cemeteries in Illinois
Nauvoo, Illinois
Cemetery
Joseph Smith
Buildings and structures in Hancock County, Illinois
Protected areas of Hancock County, Illinois
Community of Christ
Mormon cemeteries